D. balansae may refer to:
 Dacrydium balansae, a conifer species found only in New Caledonia
 Dalbergia balansae, a plant species found in China and Vietnam
 Delarbrea balansae, a flowering plant species endemic to New Caledonia

See also 
 Balansae